Princess Zainab Nazli Hanim (1853 – 28 December 1913) was an Egyptian princess from the dynasty of Muhammad Ali Pasha and one of the first women to revive the tradition of the literary salon in the Arab world, at her palace in Cairo from the 1880s until her death.

Early life
Of Turkish origin, Princess Nazlı Fazıl was born in Istanbul, Ottoman Empire, in 1853, the eldest child of Mustafa Fazıl Pasha, son of Ibrahim Pasha of Egypt and brother of the future Khedive Isma'il Pasha, and his wife Dilazad Hanim. At the age of 13, she left Egypt for Constantinople upon her father's falling out with his brother, the Khedive, in 1866. In Constantinople, she was highly educated, against prevailing tradition, and entertained foreign visitors. She was a well educated and cultured lady who spoke Turkish, Arabic, French and English.

Personal life
In December 1872, she married Turkish ambassador Halil Şerif Paşa (Khalil Bey), and moved briefly to Paris with him on his last post there. It was not a happy marriage, and her one daughter, Hayya Khanum, died in infancy. Upon his death, she moved back to Cairo, Khedivate of Egypt, and settled in a palace located nearby to the royal Abdeen Palace, named "Villa Henry".

Her second husband was Khelil Bouhageb, son of Salem Bouhageb and eventual Prime Minister of Tunisia. They married in 1900.

In memoirs of her acquaintances, it is said that she had a quick wit and loved photographs, champagne, cigarettes and her pianola.

Influence
In this palace, she began hosting soirees, and was friendly with the intellectual elites of her day, including the Egyptians, Muhammad Abduh, Saad Zaghloul, and Qasim Amin, and the British, Lord Cromer and Herbert Kitchener. She was the individual who encouraged Saad Zaghlul to learn French. He had attended law school in Cairo and became legal advisor to her. She also arranged his marriage to Safiyya Zaghlul. Additionally, it was at her insistence that Lord Cromer coordinated 'Abduh's return from exile in 1888.

Death
She died on 28 December 1913, and was buried in the Fazil Mausoleum, Imam al-Shafi'i, Cairo.

Patronages 
 Honorary President of the Musulmane Sporting Society of Tunis (1906-1913).

Ancestry

See also
 Women's literary salons and societies in the Arab world

Further reading
 Roberts, Mary (2007). Intimate outsiders: the harem in Ottoman and Orientalist art and travel literature. Duke University Press.
 Storrs, Ronald (1972). The memoirs of Sir Ronald Storrs. Ayer Publishing.
 De Guerville, A. B. (1906). "New Egypt." E.P. Dutton & Company, New York.

References

External links
Lady Layard Journals

1853 births
1913 deaths
Egyptian nobility
Egyptian people of Turkish descent
Egyptian salon-holders
Nazli Fazil
Salon-holders from the Ottoman Empire